Zhongsa Village is an administrative village under the jurisdiction of Lilong Township, Mainling County, Nyingchi City, Tibet,  with the zoning code 540422203202. The grassroots mass autonomous organization in which the village is located is the Zhongsa Villagers' Committee.

Zhongsa Village is adjacent to Caiba Village, Lilong Village, Barang Village, Jiabang Village, Yusong Village, Langgong Village, and Dejixin Village.

References

Villages in China
Geography of Tibet
Populated places in Nyingchi